The Ritz-Carlton Hotel Company, LLC is an American multinational company that operates the luxury hotel chain known as The Ritz-Carlton. The company has 108 luxury hotels and resorts in 30 countries and territories with 29,158 rooms, in addition to 46 hotels with 8,755 rooms planned for the future.

The current company was founded in 1983, when the previous owners sold the Ritz-Carlton brand name and the Ritz-Carlton hotel in Boston, Massachusetts. The brand was subsequently expanded to other locations. The company is a subsidiary of Marriott International.

Accommodations

Historical

From 2015

Predecessor company

Ritz, Carlton and Ritz-Carlton in Europe
The story of the Ritz-Carlton brand begins with Swiss hotelier César Ritz, who was well known in the hotel industry as the "king of hoteliers and hotelier to kings." He redefined luxury accommodation in Europe with his management of The Ritz in Paris and the Carlton Hotel in London, among others. He and the renowned chef from his hotels, Auguste Escoffier, opened a la carte restaurants known as "Ritz-Carlton" on board the Hamburg-Amerika Line ocean liners SS Amerika in 1905 and SS Imperator in 1913. The restaurants on those ships ceased operating in 1914 with the outbreak of World War I. Although Ritz died in 1918, his wife Marie continued the tradition of opening hotels in his name.

The Ritz-Carlton in North America

The Ritz-Carlton Investing Company was established by Albert Keller, who bought and franchised the name in the United States. The first Ritz-Carlton Hotel in the U.S. opened in New York City in 1911. It was located at 46th Street and Madison Avenue. Louis Diat ran the kitchens and invented Vichyssoise there. In 1911, the Ritz company announced its intention to expand to Philadelphia and Atlantic City. The Ritz-Carlton Philadelphia followed in 1913 at Broad & Walnut streets, designed by Horace Trumbauer and Warren & Wetmore. The Ritz-Carlton Montreal opened in 1912, not owned by Keller as it was located in Canada. Keller's Ritz-Carlton Atlantic City opened in 1921.

The first Ritz-Carlton chain

In the early 1920s, the Ritz-Carlton chain consisted of 15 hotels:

Argentina
 Plaza Hotel Buenos Aires

France
 Imperial Hotel, Menton
 Royal Hotel, Évian-les-Bains
 Splendide Hotel, Évian-les-Bains

Italy
 Grand Hotel Excelsior, Rome
 Grand Hotel, Rome (today The St. Regis Rome)
 Grand Hotel and New Casino, Rapallo
 Grand Hotel et des Iles Borromees, Lake Maggiore
 Excelsior Hotel, Naples

Switzerland
 Grand Hotel National, Lucerne

United States
 Ritz-Carlton Hotel, New York City
 Ritz-Carlton Hotel, Atlantic City

The Boston hotel

In October 1926, 29-year-old Edward N. Wyner bought a third-acre parcel at the corner of Arlington and Newbury streets and formed a partnership called The Ritz-Arlington Trust with his father, George, and business associate, John S. Slater.

The trust sold $5.8 million of bonds to finance the construction of an apartment building to be called the Mayflower. The 18-story,  brick building, designed by Strickland, Blodget & Law Architects, was far taller than anything else along Newbury Street at the time. Construction had started on the second floor when Wyner was persuaded by then-Mayor James Michael Curley to make the Mayflower a world-class, 300-room Ritz-Carlton Hotel, which opened May 19, 1927. Room rates were $5 to $15 per night; $40 per night for suites.

After a hugely successful opening, the stock market crash of 1929 and ensuing Depression brought financial difficulties. The Wyner family funded the hotel's operating losses during the early 1930s, although the interest on the bonds went unpaid. Still in 1933, when only 30 guests were registered in the hotel, Wyner turned on the lights in every guest room to give the appearance that the hotel was full.

Decline of the first Ritz-Carlton chain
The Philadelphia location was converted to an office building after only a few years in operation. The Atlantic City hotel was sold to Schine Hotels in the late 1940s, and later Sheraton Hotels in 1959.  The New York hotel was demolished in 1951, leaving only the Boston location.

Edward Wyner died of a heart attack on December 5, 1961. His six sons tried to continue operation of the Boston hotel, but were unable to overcome difficulties, and decided to sell.

The Blakeley years: 1964–1983

The unpaid interest on the bonds dissuaded many from trying to buy the hotel. But Cabot, Cabot & Forbes principal Gerald F. Blakeley Jr. was interested. After more than a year of legal work, Hale and Dorr succeeded at clearing the bond obligations, and in October 1964 Blakeley and associates Paul Hellmuth and Charles Spaulding acquired the Ritz-Carlton Boston for $5.8 million.

"Out of the 20 years I owned it, it made money three years. The other years it broke even, but from a public relations standpoint for CC&F, it was a tremendous asset," said Blakeley, who constructed a 19-story addition to the hotel in 1981, which included more function space, 80 more guest rooms, and 52 condominiums.

In the late 1960s Blakeley obtained the rights to the Ritz-Carlton name in North America (with the exception of Montreal and New York). In June 1978, Blakeley was awarded the rights and privileges of the Ritz-Carlton trademark in the United States and was given a US Service Mark Registration.

In the 1970s, the Ritz-Carlton name was licensed to the builders of a new hotel in Chicago. The Ritz-Carlton Chicago opened in 1975 in a tower atop Water Tower Place. It joined the Four Seasons Hotels & Resorts chain in 1977, as there was no Ritz-Carlton chain at the time. Confusingly, it remained part of Four Seasons for decades, marketed as "The Ritz-Carlton Chicago (A Four Seasons Hotel)". It had no association with the modern Ritz-Carlton chain, though it used the name and the iconic logo. The property was sold in 2013 and left Four Seasons, joining the modern Ritz-Carlton chain as a franchise on August 1, 2015.

In 1982, Blakely licensed the name to hotelier John B. Coleman for two hotels he was renovating, The Fairfax in Washington, D.C. and the Navarro in New York City. Coleman renamed them The Ritz-Carlton Washington D.C. and The Ritz-Carlton New York in April 1982. Coleman paid Blakely a fee of 1.5 percent of each hotel's annual gross revenue for use of the name. The two hotels eventually joined the modern chain that would be founded a few years later.

Current company
In August 1983, Blakeley sold The Ritz-Carlton Boston and the US trademark for $75.5 million to William B. Johnson, a major Waffle House franchisee who was once the largest owner. He assembled a four-person development team in Atlanta, headed by hotelier Horst Schulze, to create the Ritz-Carlton hotel brand and established The Ritz-Carlton Hotel Company in its current form.

In 1988, Johnson subsequently obtained the exclusive rights to The Ritz-Carlton brand name throughout the world except for the Hôtel Ritz Paris, The Ritz-Carlton, Chicago, and the Ritz-Carlton Montreal. Unlike The Ritz-Carlton, Chicago and the Ritz-Carlton Montreal, Hôtel Ritz Paris is not associated with The Ritz-Carlton Hotel Company, instead joining The Leading Hotels of the World.

The corporate years: 1983–1999

From 1951 to 1975, The Ritz-Carlton Boston had been one of only two Ritz-Carlton hotels in the US. The other was the independently owned Ritz-Carlton Atlantic City which had since been converted to condominiums. Johnson's company paid the Atlantic City establishment to abandon its name and rename itself The Ritz Condominiums.

Johnson would later enlarge the company from just the Boston property to 30 hotels worldwide in just 10 years. He obtained financing to do so from Manufacturers Hanover Trust of New York in 1983 in the amount of $85 million secured by The Ritz-Carlton Boston. This loan was refinanced in 1989 by Manhattan Tops USA of New York for $136.5 million and again in 1994 by The Sumitomo Bank of Japan. By 1996, this mortgage was in default and the interest and penalties brought the total debt to $214.8 million. By splitting this mortgage note into three parts, Sumitomo Bank was able to unbundle The Ritz-Carlton Boston from the trademark rights to the Ritz-Carlton brand worldwide.

Blackstone Real Estate Acquisitions bought The Ritz-Carlton Boston at auction for $75 million in February 1998. A month later, Marriott International acquired the hotel from Blackstone for $100 million. Marriott International, which franchised and managed over 325,000 rooms, then bought The Ritz-Carlton Hotel Co. and rights to the Ritz-Carlton hotel chain worldwide from Johnson for $290 million in a two-part transaction completed in 1998.

Disposal of the historic Boston property
In 1998, Christopher Jeffries, founding partner of Millennium Partners, obtained The Ritz-Carlton franchises from Marriott for four hotel properties under construction: two in Washington, one in New York City, and one in Atlanta, Georgia. In addition, Jeffries was searching for a brand affiliation for the new 155-room hotel and 270-luxury condominiums he was constructing as part of Boston's  Millennium Place, a mixed-use complex on lower Washington Street. Due to noncompetition clauses, the only way he could obtain a second Ritz-Carlton flag in Boston was to own the existing Ritz-Carlton.

Millennium Partners acquired the original Ritz-Carlton Boston for $122 million (though it had sold for just $75 million less than two years prior) and spent $50 million for renovations. Marriott agreed to allow The Ritz-Carlton affiliation for the condominium complex, known as The Residences at The Ritz-Carlton, sharing all of the services of the hotel.

From 2001 to 2007, Boston was home to two Ritz-Carlton hotels that faced each other across Boston Common. The Ritz-Carlton, Boston Common opened in 2001.

In November 2006, Taj Hotels, a subsidiary of the India-based Tata Group, purchased The Ritz-Carlton Boston from its owners, Millennium Partners for $170 million. The Ritz-Carlton Boston became the Taj Boston on January 11, 2007.

Today

The company grew under the leadership of President and COO Horst Schulze. Schulze instituted a company-wide concentration on both the personal and the data-driven sides of service: He coined the company's well-known customer/employee-centered motto, "We are Ladies and Gentlemen Serving Ladies and Gentlemen" and the set of specific service values (standards) on which The Ritz-Carlton employees base service through the present day. Under his leadership the hotels earned an unprecedented two Malcolm Baldrige National Quality Awards and grew from four to forty U.S. locations.

During this time, The Ritz-Carlton also became known for its influence on service in a wide range of industries, through the creation of The Ritz-Carlton Learning Institute and The Ritz-Carlton Leadership Center, created  by then-Ritz executive Leonardo Inghilleri, who was an architect of the Ritz's second Baldrige award, where executives from other companies worldwide in many disciplines come to learn The Ritz-Carlton principles of service.

In 1995, Marriott International purchased a 49% stake in The Ritz-Carlton Hotel Company, and in 1998, they purchased an additional 50% stake in the company, giving it 99% ownership of the company. Schulze and other executives (including Leonardo Inghilleri, Robert A. Warman and Peter Schoch) left to form the West Paces Hotel Group, which took the name of its primary brand, Capella Hotels, in December 2011. In 2007, the partners also formed Solís Hotels.

The Ritz-Carlton Hotel Company claims it is headquartered in Chevy Chase, Maryland, though the headquarters address is the Marriott address in Bethesda, Maryland, located in the Washington, D.C. MSA.

The Ritz-Carlton Hotel Company partnered with Bulgari in 2001 to operate a chain of hotels owned by and operated under the BVLGARI brand.  The company currently has marketing agreements with Bulgari Hotels & Resorts, the Cosmopolitan of Las Vegas, the privately owned Ritz-Carlton Montreal and The Ritz Hotel London.

In 2011, The Ritz-Carlton, Hong Kong was opened. It was at the time the highest hotel in the world (later surpassed by Rosewood Guangzhou).

Simon Cooper joined Ritz-Carlton in 2001 as President and Chief Operating Officer, taking the helm from Horst Schulze. Cooper's mandate was to grow the chain through hotel expansion and product diversification.  Under Cooper's watch the company has aggressively expanded its hotels and added The Ritz-Carlton Residences, private residential units, and The Ritz-Carlton Destination Club, fractional ownership residences, to the company's development program.

August 12, 2010, Ritz-Carlton announced its new President and Chief Operations Officer would be Herve Humler, one of the founders of the 1983 company, who will be responsible for leading brand operations and global growth strategy. In 2015, The Ritz-Carlton, Macau was opened. It is located at the Galaxy Macau. The Ritz-Carlton, Macau is designed as a gold palace.

On July 10, 2020, Forbes mentioned how luxury brand collaborated to attract luxury buyers, Asprey and Ritz Carlton partnered for their 'purple water beauty amenities,' which includes body lotions and shampoos within the hotel rooms.

Awards
The Ritz-Carlton Hotel Company has been featured on Zagat Survey Top Lists for dining, hotels and service. The Dallas, TX and Wolfsburg, Germany locations both received top honors from Zagat in 2009, including Top Large Hotel for the Dallas location. The Ritz-Carlton is the only company to date to win two Malcolm Baldrige National Quality Awards (1992 and 1999).  Ritz-Carlton's President and COO Horst Schulze was recognized for Ritz-Carlton's contributions during his tenure with Corporate Hotelier of the World Ishikawa Medal for contributions to the Quality movement.

Other accomplishments
The Ritz-Carlton is notable for attempting to share its knowledge of quality as it applies to service. Initially this was done at the request of the Baldrige committee, but The Ritz-Carlton ultimately adopted this as a central mission through the creation of The Ritz-Carlton Learning Institute and The Ritz-Carlton Leadership Center.

In October 2011, Angella Reid, the General Manager of The Ritz-Carlton Hotel in Pentagon City, Virginia was appointed as White House Chief Usher, becoming the first woman to serve in that post.

It also has major service training operations in its Ritz-Carlton Learning Institute and Ritz-Carlton Leadership Center, created by Ritz-Carlton executive (emeritus) Leonardo Inghilleri, where nearly 50,000 executives from other companies worldwide have been trained in The Ritz-Carlton principles of service.

Notable current properties

The Ritz-Carlton Kuala Lumpur, in Malaysia's capital city, opened in 1997. It is the only 'all butler hotel' operating in the city, offering butler service to all of its 300+ rooms and suites and has since been ranked among the "Gold List" of hotels by Condé Nast, ranked as "one of the top five butler hotels" by The Independent and regarded by Travel and Leisure as one of "The World's Greatest Hotels".

In 1999, Ritz-Carlton acquired the former Hotel St. Moritz in New York City, re-establishing a presence for the brand in New York City for the first time since the former Ritz-Carlton New York left the Ritz-Carlton stable in 1997 (it later became a Westin, then an InterContinental, then condominiums).

The first Ritz-Carlton Hotel in Russia, the Ritz-Carlton Hotel Moscow, opened July 1, 2007, on Tverskaya Street.

On March 29, 2011, The Ritz-Carlton opened the highest hotel in the world, The Ritz-Carlton, Hong Kong on floors 102-118 of the International Commerce Centre in Tsim Sha Tsui on Kowloon Peninsula, Hong Kong. Asian Headquarters of Morgan Stanley, Credit Suisse, and Deutsche Bank are also located in the same 118-story building.

The Ritz-Carlton, Charlotte which opened in October 2009 is the first Ritz-Carlton property to earn LEED Gold Certification and the youngest Ritz-Carlton property to earn five-diamonds, and is the only five diamond property in Charlotte (and one of only three in the state of North Carolina).

The Ritz-Carlton, Fort Lauderdale (AAA Five Diamond Award) which opened in August 2008 opened as a St. Regis just one year prior.

The Ritz-Carlton and JW Marriott Hotels at L.A. Live opened February 2010 and share the first skyscraper built since the early 1990s in Downtown Los Angeles. The Ritz-Carlton, Los Angeles was awarded a LEED silver certification.

The readers of Condé Nast Traveler elected The Ritz-Carlton Shanghai, Pudong as "The Best Hotel in Asia" from 2012 through 2014.

The Ritz-Carlton operates fractional residences at several locations in the United States under the name Ritz-Carlton Destination Club. Properties include Aspen Highlands and Vail in Colorado, St. Thomas in the U.S. Virgin Islands, San Francisco and Jupiter, Florida.

On Friday, July 17, 2009, at 7:47 a.m. Jakarta time, a bomb exploded in The Ritz-Carlton Mega Kuningan, Jakarta, Indonesia destroying the first floor of the hotel. The explosion occurred 2 minutes after the explosion at the nearby JW Marriott Jakarta. The hotel was scheduled to host the Manchester United football club the following Monday during the Indonesia leg of its Asia tour, but the visit was canceled due to the bombing. Nine people including 2 suicide bombers were killed.

On August 26, 2013, members of the Filipino diaspora protested at The Ritz-Carlton, Los Angeles and JW Marriott Hotels at L.A. Live against the Priority Development Assistance Fund scam. It is believed that the family of the alleged mastermind of the scam Janet Lim-Napoles owned a condominium unit in the building said to be worth $2 million.

On October 31, 2013, The Ritz-Carlton Bangalore opened as the group's first property in India.

On November 4, 2013, the Ritz-Carlton Kazakhstan opened in Almaty. The 145-room hotel sits on the top floors of the Esentai Tower, the tallest building in Central Asia. 

In January 2014, Ritz-Carlton opened a hotel in Herzliya, Israel featuring a spa and the brand's first kosher restaurant.

In May 2017, Ritz-Carlton opened a hotel in Jeddah, Saudi Arabia, the hotel was also opened as a conference hall making it one of the largest conference halls in Jeddah. The Hotel is located in Al-Hamra district, a place famous for its luxury hotels and nearness to the Corniche.

In February 2022, Ritz-Carlton will open its second Australian hotel, located in Melbourne inside the West Side Place complex. The hotel spans floors 61-81 of the 81-storey building, with its sky lobby located on floor 79.

Cruise ships
In 2018, Ritz-Carlton announced that it would enter the cruise market. Construction problems at the Spanish shipyard and COVID-19 delayed the launch of the first ship, the Evrima, originally set to January 2020. Inauguration cruise has been moved numerous times due to pandemic: April 2021, November 2021 and currently May 6, 2022. The cruising arm of Ritz-Carlton would operate under the brand "The Ritz-Carlton Yacht Collection". It was announced that The Ritz-Carlton Yacht Collection would join the Marriott Bonvoy, Marriott International's travel program effective November 9, 2021.

After a number of delays, Ritz-Carlton Yacht Collection finally took guests onboard its first ship, Evrima, in October 2022. The ship sailed from Barcelona, Spain.

Former properties

Asia
 Jimbaran, Bali, Indonesia: The Ritz Carlton Bali, Resort & Spa—Opened on November 29, 1996, as the first Ritz-Carlton resort in Asia, management terminated on March 31, 2009. Property reopened on April 1, 2009, as Ayana Resort & Spa Bali, with sister hotels also opened within the 90-hectare integrated resort such as Rimba Jimbaran - Bali (opened 2013), The Villas at Ayana Resort Bali, and Ayana Residences Bali. All hotels managed by the Capella Hotel Group.
 Gangnam, Seoul, South Korea: Renovated and reopened as the Le Méridien Seoul in 2017.
 Iran: Tehran in Ferdowsi square during the 50s. The upper floor of the site are now abandoned but the ground floor has converted to a towel shop since the mid-70s.

Europe
 Enniskerry, Ireland: Ritz-Carlton Powerscourt Hotel:  Management terminated October 1, 2013

North America
 Atlanta, Georgia: Buckhead Ritz-Carlton - reopened as The Whitley December 2017
 Aspen, Colorado: Ritz-Carlton Aspen—Management terminated August 2, 1997
 Cancún, Mexico: Ritz-Carlton Cancún—Opened 1993 and rebranded as Kempinski on September 1, 2022
 Dearborn, Michigan: Ritz-Carlton Dearborn—Management terminated June 2, 2010
 Houston, Texas: Ritz-Carlton Houston—Management terminated August 2, 1997
 Kansas City, Missouri:  Ritz-Carlton Kansas City
 Lake Las Vegas Ritz-Carlton: Opened 2003; closed May 2, 2010
 Montego Bay, Jamaica: Ritz-Carlton Rose Hall—Management terminated July 2013
 Palm Beach, Florida: Ritz-Carlton Palm Beach—Management terminated July 1, 2013
 Pasadena, California: Ritz-Carlton Huntington—Opened 1991; management terminated January 2008
 Phoenix, Arizona: Ritz-Carlton Phoenix—Opened 1988; management contract ended July 24, 2015
 Washington, District of Columbia: Ritz-Carlton Washington D.C.—Management terminated August 2, 1997
 White Plains, New York: The Ritz-Carlton New York, Westchester--- Opened December 2008 Management Terminated September 2020

Australia
 Sydney Ritz-Carlton Double Bay: management terminated 2001

In popular culture

In E.B. White's 1970 children's novel The Trumpet of the Swan, the main character Louis (a trumpeter swan) stays at the Ritz-Carlton Boston, where he eats watercress sandwiches and sleeps in the bathtub.

On the HBO original series Boardwalk Empire, the character of Enoch "Nucky" Thompson (portrayed by Steve Buscemi), the treasurer of Atlantic County, occupies the entire 9th floor of a fictionalized version of the hotel in Atlantic City, New Jersey. The real Enoch "Nucky" Johnson on which Nucky Thompson was based did in fact occupy an entire floor of suites at the Ritz-Carlton Atlantic City until his arrest in 1941 on charges of tax evasion.

A 1922 novella by F. Scott Fitzgerald is titled The Diamond as Big as the Ritz.

The 2003 film American Wedding used the Ritz-Carlton in Half Moon Bay, California, as the filming location for the wedding venue.

The Ritz also features in the Irving Berlin song "Puttin' On the Ritz" in which the hotel chain served as an inspiration for the titular expression, meaning to live opulently.

In 2015, the rapper Plies released the song "Ran Off On Da Plug Twice", originally titled "Ritz Carlton".  In the song, he raps about his affinity for routinely spending time at the lavish hotel.

Michael Hutchence of INXS, aged 37, was found dead at the Ritz-Carlton hotel in Double Bay, Sydney on November 22, 1997, in Room 524.

American telenovela and drama Jane the Virgin uses the Ritz-Carlton Marina Del Rey's property as the setting for the show, while the storyline is based in Miami (whereas that Ritz-Carlton Marina Del Rey is in Los Angeles, California).

The 1939 song "A Nightingale Sang in Berkeley Square" includes the line "There were angels dining at the Ritz," referring specifically to the Ritz London's restaurant. This is in turn referenced by scenes in Terry Pratchett and Neil Gaiman's novel Good Omens and the miniseries based on it in which an angel and a demon (or fallen angel) have lunch at the Ritz London.

The CW 2017 soap reboot Dynasty features The Ritz-Carlton Reynolds, Lake Oconee in Greensboro, GA as the set for Season 2, Episode 11 "The Sight of You" which aired on January 25, 2019. For this episode, the hotel serves as a destination for a "girls' trip" to a ski lodge in Idaho.

See also

References

External links

 Ritz-Carlton Hotels Official Website
 Ritz-Carlton Destination Club Official Website
 Ritz-Carlton Corporate Website

 
Hotel chains in the United States
Companies based in Bethesda, Maryland
American companies established in 1983
Hotels established in 1983
1983 establishments in Massachusetts
Luxury brands
Marriott International
Marriott International brands
American brands
1998 mergers and acquisitions